Lucien Dubuc (November 29, 1877 – March 5, 1956) was a lawyer, judge and briefly a provincial level politician from Alberta, Canada.

Early life
Lucien Dubuc's father was Joseph Dubuc who was a prominent Canadian federal and provincial politician as well a pioneer lawyer.

Political career
Dubuc ran for a seat to the Alberta Legislature in the Peace River provincial electoral district as an Independent in the 1905 Alberta general election. He defeated Liberal candidate James Cornwall by an unknown number of votes.

The election however was overturned by the provincial cabinet due to significant irregularities and even going so far as to question whether the vote was held at all. Dubuc took the matter to court to force the Executive council to recognize the results and prevent the calling of a new election. His legal action failed when the judge ruled that they had no jurisdiction in the matter.

Judicial career
Dubuc moved to a house he had built in Edmonton in 1912 where he resided until 1956. He set up a legal practice in Edmonton when he arrived in 1912. He was appointed to the district court bench in 1920 and in 1924 Chief Justice of Northern Alberta.

His obituary was printed in The Edmonton Journal on March 6, 1956.

References

Judges in Alberta
1877 births
1956 deaths
Independent candidates in Alberta provincial elections